Russian Unity was a political party in Crimea, registered in October 2008. A Kyiv Court banned the party "from activity on the territory of Ukraine" on 30 April 2014. Party leader Sergey Aksyonov was instrumental in making possible the annexation of Crimea by the Russian Federation. The party was based in Crimea, which has a Russian-speaking majority. The party was dissolved on 5 May 2014.

Although the party took positions on a number of issues, the party's main focus was Russian language rights and promoting Ukrainian relations with Russia before the 2014 Crimean Crisis, in which it became supportive of secession from Ukraine to join Russia; after this occurred, it merged into the Russian political party United Russia.

History 
The party was founded in Simferopol under the original name Vanguard and registered by the Ukrainian Ministry of Justice in October 2008. In August 2010 they were renamed Russian Unity. It won 3 seats (of the 100 in total) during the 2010 Crimean parliamentary election in the Supreme Council of Crimea.

In the 2012 Ukrainian parliamentary election the party competed in/for 4 constituencies (seats), all of them located in the Autonomous Republic of Crimea; but it won in none and thus missed parliamentary representation. The party's best result was in constituency 1 (located in Simferopol) with 9.12%. In constituency 2 (also located in Simferopol) it scored 4.12%, in constituency 6 (in Feodosiya) 4.11% and in constituency 10 (in Bakhchysarai) 2.28%.

In 2014 the party was involved in protests and the seizure of government buildings, including the Supreme Council of Crimea (the parliament of the Autonomous Republic of Crimea), during the 2014 Crimean crisis. Party leader Sergey Aksyonov was named Prime Minister of Crimea on 27 February 2014, and then called for a referendum on Crimea's autonomy. On 11 March Crimea adopted a declaration of independence and held on 17 March the 2014 Crimean status referendum that lead to the 21 March 2014 annexation of Crimea by the Russian Federation.

The Ministry of Justice of Ukraine filed a lawsuit at the District Administrative Court in Kyiv for the ban of activities of the party (and also for a ban on the party Russian Bloc) on 23 April 2014. On 30 April (2014) the Court banned the party "from activity on the territory of Ukraine". The Court stated that the signing of Aksenov of the treaty that formally sealed the annexation of Crimea by the Russian Federation was evidence of "encroachment on the territorial integrity of Ukraine".

In August 2014 the party signed a cooperation agreement with Latvian Russian Union, a Russian political party in Latvia, to "strengthen the unity of the Russian world."

The party was dissolved and merged into United Russia on 5 May 2014.

Party leaders 
 2008–2010: Maksym Kovalenko
 2010–2014: Sergey Aksyonov

References

External links 
  

Political parties established in 2008
Annexation of Crimea by the Russian Federation
Political parties in Crimea
Russian political parties in Ukraine
Regionalist parties in Ukraine
Defunct political parties in Ukraine
2008 establishments in Ukraine
2014 disestablishments in Ukraine
Banned political parties in Ukraine
United Russia
Treason in Ukraine
Russian minority interests parties